Swizz Beatz Presents G.H.E.T.T.O. Stories is a compilation album by American hip hop record producer and recording artist Swizz Beatz, released December 10, 2002, under Interscope, DreamWorks and Full Surface. It debuted at number 50 on the US Billboard 200 album chart, selling 60,000 copies in its first week.

The album spawned three singles, including the hit "Good Times", as performed by Styles P. "Good Times" was also included on Styles P's 2002 debut album A Gangster and a Gentleman. The song "Shyne", as performed by Shyne, was included on his 2004 album Godfather Buried Alive, which was released while Shyne was imprisoned.

Critical reception

Tracklisting

Notes
 (co.) Co-producer
 (add.) Additional production

Chart positions

Weekly charts

Year-end charts

References

Albums produced by Swizz Beatz
Swizz Beatz albums
2002 compilation albums
Full Surface Records compilation albums
Hip hop compilation albums
Albums produced by Bob Rock
East Coast hip hop compilation albums
DreamWorks Records compilation albums